is an anime film released in July 1968. It is the directorial feature film debut of Isao Takahata and was also worked on by Hayao Miyazaki. Horus marked the beginning of their partnership that would last for the next 50 years across numerous animation studios.

The core production team for Horus, Prince of the Sun included Takahata (Director), Yasuo Otsuka (Animation Director), Miyazaki (Scene Design, Key Animation), Yasuji Mori (Key Animation), Reiko Okuyama (Key Animation), and Yoichi Kotabe (Key Animation).  This group contributed to designs, story ideas and storyboards; all but Takahata (who is not an animator) contributed to character designs. Akemi Ota, Masatake Kita, and Sadao Kikuchi were the remaining Key Animators, but did not contribute many ideas to the film.

The movie was released straight to television in the United States by AIP-TV under the title The Little Norse Prince.

Synopsis
Set in an unspecified northern kingdom in ancient Norway, the film opens with the young Horus (aka Hols, voiced by Hisako Ōkata in Japanese and Billie Lou Watt in English) attempting to fight off a pack of "silver wolves," and accidentally waking up an ancient stone giant, named Mogue (or Rockoar in some editions of the film). Horus succeeds in pulling a splinter from the giant's shoulder, which transpires to be a rusty and ancient sword. The giant proclaims this to be the "Sword of the Sun," promising also that when the sword has been reforged, he will come to Horus, who will then be called "Prince of the Sun".

Horus' father, on his deathbed, reveals that their family came from a northern seaside village, which was devastated by the terrifying ice devil Grunwald, leaving them the only survivors. Before dying, Horus' father urges his son to return to the land of his birth and avenge the village.

On his journey, Horus and his companion, a bear named Koro, are soon confronted by Grunwald, who plunges the boy from a cliff when Horus refuses to serve him. Horus survives the fall and is rescued by the inhabitants of a nearby village. Horus soon becomes a heroic figure when he kills an enormous pike which had been threatening the lives and livelihoods of this fishing community.

The pike was a ploy of Grunwald's, who then sends the silver wolves to attack the village instead. In the battle that follows, Horus and Koro chase the wolves to a deserted village, where he meets a mysterious young girl named Hilda. Horus takes Hilda back to his village, where her beautiful singing is welcomed by the villagers, with the exception of the chief, who is increasingly resentful of Horus' popularity, and his deputy, Drago. Hilda, who is actually Grunwald's sister and under his evil influence, later collaborates with Drago and sends a swarm of rats to attack the village (in the original Japanese version, Grunwald wanted Horus to be his brother before he plunged Horus down the cliff; this ties in with Horus' first encounter with Hilda and her comment on how they both share the same fate that they're like twins). Drago frames Horus for his own failed attempt to assassinate the chief, and the villagers banish Horus.

Horus sets out in search of Grunwald, but is confronted by Hilda, and the owl who acts as a messenger between Hilda and Grunwald. With her true identity revealed, Hilda reluctantly attacks Horus, who falls into a chasm and becomes trapped in an enchanted wood, where he is haunted by visions of the villagers and his father. Grunwald then sends Hilda, against her wishes, to kill Horus, and makes his own attack on the village, together with his wolves and a giant ice mammoth.

Horus is able to escape from the enchanted forest when he realizes that the sword must be reforged as a collective effort and that the villagers must unite in order to defeat Grunwald. After a brief fight with Hilda, who is thoroughly remorseful about her involvement in Grunwald's plan, Horus rejoins the villagers in their battle and uses the raging fires they ignited in their defense to reforge the sword. With the "Sword of the Sun" reforged, he is soon joined by the stone giant Mogue. Together they defeat and destroy Grunwald. Hilda, who had given her magical "Medal of Life" to aid Horus, finds that she is still alive without it, and rejoins Horus and the villagers. While they Are Running, A Fallen golem can be seen.

Voice cast

Production
The story of Horus is based on the puppet play , created by screenwriter , which in turn is a reinterpretation of an epic from Yukar, the oral tradition of the Ainu people, the indigenous people of the island of Hokkaido. For Horus the setting was changed to Scandinavia to avoid any controversy due to depiction of the Ainu people. The story was also inspired by the intention to address an adult audience, to reflect societal changes in contemporary Japan and to portray the socialist ideals in the portrayed village community, where the protagonists not only improve their own lot in a coming of age story but where their personal growth benefits society at large as well. The film shows a place where the people are able to shake off oppressive forces and derive pleasure from their communal efforts such as subsistence fishing.

Production on Horus started in Autumn, 1965 but, due to the perfectionism of the creators, was not completed until March, 1968, at a time when other feature-length animated films at Toei were made in approximately 8–10 months and focus at the company was shifting towards production of television animation. Director Takahata and animation director Ōtsuka approached the process in an egalitarian manner and invited input from the entire team for storyboard and planning meetings, a method which opened the door for Miyazaki to contribute significantly to the development of the story and animation.

Reception
As quoted in The Encyclopedia of Japanese Pop Culture by Mark Schilling, a reviewer for Hakubunkan's monthly magazine  commented, in 1968, "In one corner of the world there now exists a commercial animation that has surpassed Disney and started to make rapid advances", after seeing Horus and The Jungle Book.

Helen McCarthy, in her  book Hayao Miyazaki; Master of Japanese Animation, notes that the film had only a brief theatrical release despite its critical and popular success. McCarthy notes that Yasuji Mori's "clean and simple character design" for Hilda "allowed for considerable emotional depth and flexibility" and she observed that this style remained a powerful influence on the works of Takahata and Miyazaki throughout their animation careers.

In 2001, the Japanese magazine Animage elected Horus, Prince of the Sun the third best anime production of all time.

In his Anime Explosion, Patrick Drazen mentions the film as a pivotal work in the evolution of animation and writes that the 10-day theatrical showing was either a sign that Toei studio executives were unable to recognise quality or a ploy to get back at Union organizers like Miyazaki and Takahata, who didn't direct for the company again. Drazen notes that the ending scenes in the film were thinly disguised rallying cries for the union and student movements of the time, by whom the film was well received.

Drazen is among the analysts who makes note of the conflicted heroine Hilda, and writes that the character comes across as complex, working sometimes for good and sometimes for evil, and can be seen as the first in a long line of multidimensional heroines in the oeuvre of Takahata and Miyazaki.

The influence on Japanese cel animation of Ōtsuka's approach for Horus has been singled out. Thomas LaMarre writes, in The Anime Machine, that understanding Yasuo Ōtsuka's style is especially important for an understanding of Hayao Miyazaki's work. The sequence in which Horus fights the giant fish in particular has been referenced as a pivotal moment in the evolution of the medium and as a scene which had a profound impact on the animation works later produced at Studio Ghibli.

Justin Sevakis, writing a retrospective review for Anime News Network, in March 2014, noted that the film was a financial flop but almost immediately gained a following among young people. Sevakis states that despite its flaws Horus is one of the few animated stories from the period that can still be recommended to an adult audience.

In 2017, Mike Toole of Anime News Network, placed the film first on his 100 Best Anime Movies of All Time list.

Home video

In 2005, Optimum Releasing released the film as The Little Norse Prince on DVD for the UK and Ireland, under its Optimum Asia label. The DVD includes English-language subtitles but no extra features other than the 1968 Japanese trailer, and is locked to region 2. The subtitles were criticized for being incomplete, often skipping dialog and completely omitting the songs, but they do refer to the title character as "Hols", and the video presentation was criticized for the presence of ghosting artefacts as a result of being converted from 60 Hz to 50 Hz for compatibility with European TVs and players. However, this release was the first time that the film had ever been widely available with its original audio and English subtitles at all, and was for almost a decade the only way of viewing the film as such. This release is currently out of print.

In 2013, the film was released in Japan on Blu-ray Disc by Toei. The version of the film on this release, however, was discovered to be not sourced from a new, high-definition restoration but upscaled from the existing, standard-definition transfer that dates back to the film's release on LaserDisc by CAV and which was the source of Toei's and all other existing releases of the film on DVD. No English language subtitles are present on this release.

On December 23, 2014, Discotek Media released the film as Horus, Prince of the Sun on DVD for Northern America. This release features a new English-language subtitle translation (which is more complete and more accurate than the subtitles on the Optimum release, except that they refer to the title character as "Horus"), two audio commentaries, video interviews with Isao Takahata and Yoichi Kotabe, four written essays, production galleries, and the 1968 trailer with new subtitles. It is stated to be locked to region 1 on its packaging and Discotek's website, but was discovered to be compatible with all regions. This is the first U.S. release of the movie in its original Japanese version, and the first release of its English dub on disc. Unlike the Optimum DVD release, it has not been converted to 50 Hz, so does not suffer from ghosting.

On January 21, 2015, the upscaled Blu-ray Disc edition of the movie was included in Walt Disney Studios Japan's The Complete Works of Isao Takahata boxset, which contains ten of the director's films. This version is identical to Toei's standalone BD release.

On March 28, 2017, Discotek Media released the film as Horus, Prince of the Sun on Blu-ray Disc for Northern America. This release includes the original Japanese audio and the AIP English dub as well as commentaries, interviews and trailers and is locked to region A.

The AIP library was eventually purchased by Metro-Goldwyn-Mayer, which had aired the film as Little Norse Prince on U.S. television. MGM licensed out the uncut English dub made for Little Norse Prince as an audio option on the Discotek Media DVD and BD releases, and the AIP version has been available on many video streaming websites in Northern America including Hulu, Netflix, and Amazon Video as of 2015.

References

External links

Listing on GhibliWiki

1968 films
1968 anime films
1968 directorial debut films
1960s fantasy adventure films
Adventure anime and manga
American International Pictures films
Animated adventure films
Discotek Media
Films directed by Isao Takahata
Japanese animated fantasy films
Japanese fantasy adventure films
Toei Animation films
Toei Company films